Arnala class was an Indian designation for the Petya III-class vessels of the Indian Navy.

Although these vessels were classified as frigates in the Soviet Navy, they were classified by the Indian Navy as anti-submarine corvettes due to their role and smaller size. Vessels of the class were named for Indian islands.

Operational history

The hulls of this class were of relatively inferior quality, requiring the vessels to undergo major refit every 5 years. The Indian Navy constructed the Naval Dockyard at Visakhapatnam, primarily to service Russian vessels. But given the lack of engineering support from Russia there were inordinate delays in completing the servicing facility.

Vessels
The corvettes of this class constituted the 31st Patrol Vessel Squadron of the Eastern Naval Command and the 32nd Patrol Vessel Squadron of the Western Naval Command.

References

 
Corvette classes
Corvettes of the Indian Navy
India–Soviet Union relations